The Royal Theatre is a proscenium arch theatre and concert hall located in Victoria, British Columbia, Canada. It was designed in 1912 by William D'Oyly Hamilton Rochfort and Eben W. Sankey. Rochfort was very active as an architect in Victoria from 1908 until he left for the war in 1914. Opened in 1913, the theatre has operated under many guises, including cinema (1917–1981; operated during some of that time by Famous Players), in 1972 the Municipalities of Oak Bay, Saanich and Victoria purchased the theatre from Famous Players. Since 1982, it has become one of the finest touring destinations in Canada with a fully modernized production department and box office system, while maintaining the grace and style that an early 19th century provides.

The theatre was designated a National Historic Site of Canada in 1987.

Today, the theatre has a capacity of 1,416. It is a popular venue, staging concerts, and musicals, featuring the best of local and international productions.

Notable visiting performers
Sarah Bernhardt
Carlos Montoya
Mikhail Baryshnikov
Luciano Pavarotti
Roger Hodgson
"Weird Al" Yankovic
Crosby Stills and Nash 
Broadway Touring Local Opera Productions International Touring Dance

See also
 List of historic places in Victoria, British Columbia

References

External links
 

1994 Commonwealth Games venues
Buildings and structures in Victoria, British Columbia
Heritage sites in British Columbia
Theatres in British Columbia
Culture of Victoria, British Columbia
National Historic Sites in British Columbia
Music venues in British Columbia
Theatres completed in 1913
Tourist attractions in Victoria, British Columbia
Theatres on the National Historic Sites of Canada register
1913 establishments in British Columbia